is a 1974 Japanese martial arts film starring Sonny Chiba.

Plot

Cast
 Sonny Chiba - Ryuichi Koga
 Makoto Satō - Takeshi Hayato
 Yutaka Nakajima - Emi
 Eiji Gō - Ichiro Sakura
 Hiroyuki Sanada - Ryuichi Koga as a boy
 Ryō Ikebe as Arashiyama

Home media
Executioner was bundled with The Bullet Train and Golgo 13: Assignment Kowloon in the Kill Chiba Collection Region 1 DVD set by Crash Cinema on May 18, 2004.

References

External links 
 

1974 films
Karate films
Japanese martial arts films
1974 action films
1970s Japanese-language films
1974 martial arts films
Japanese films set in New York City
1970s Japanese films